Élton Constantino da Silva (born 20 July 1989), simply known as Élton is a Brazilian professional footballer playing as a midfielder for Romanian Liga III club Corvinul Hunedoara.

Club career
Élton started his career with Botafogo-SP in 2008. Two years later, he joined Audax. After 14 appearances for the club, he switched to Taubaté in 2011 and played there until 2012. In 2013, he switched clubs, being transferred to  Pandurii Târgu-Jiu in Romania, where his twin brother Erico was playing. The following year, he was close to a move to CFR Cluj but eventually remained at Pandurii. In 2016, he joined Lithuanian side Žalgiris Vilnius.

Honours
Žalgiris Vilnius
Lithuanian Cup: 2015–16
Lithuanian Super Cup: 2016
Ferroviária
Copa Paulista: 2017

References

External links

1989 births
Living people
Association football midfielders
Brazilian footballers
Grêmio Osasco Audax Esporte Clube players
Botafogo Futebol Clube (SP) players
Esporte Clube Taubaté players
CS Pandurii Târgu Jiu players
FK Žalgiris players
FC Voluntari players
Associação Ferroviária de Esportes players
Esporte Clube São Bento players
CS Corvinul Hunedoara players
Liga I players
Liga III players
A Lyga players
Brazilian expatriate footballers
Expatriate footballers in Lithuania
Brazilian expatriate sportspeople in Lithuania